Padmanabha is an epithet of the Hindu deity Vishnu. It may refer to:

Places
 Padmanabhaswamy Temple, in Trivandrum, Kerala, India
 Padmanabhapuram, a town in Kanyakumari district, Tamil Nadu, India
 Anantha Padmanabha Swamy Temple, in Vikarabad, Andhra Pradesh, India
 Padmanabhanagar, a neighborhood in Bangalore, Karnataka, India
 Padmanaba Nagar Assembly constituency

Religion
 One of the Thousand Names of Lord Vishnu in the Sanskrit hymn Vishnu Sahasranama
 Padmanabha, in the Jain tradition, the future reincarnation of Bimbisara, King of Magadha
 Padmanabha Swamy, the presiding deity at the Padmanabhaswamy Temple in Thiruvananthapuram, Kerala, India

Other
Padmanābha (poet), 15th century Indian poet